Alexander  Naumovich Kolker (born 28 July 1933, Leningrad) is a Soviet and Russian composer. Honored Artist of the RSFSR (1981).

Biography 

He was married to singer Maria Pakhomenko until her death in 2013.

Filmography 
 1966 – We Fly to the Ocean
 1966 – White Night
 1967 – Private Life of Kuzyayev Valentin
 1968 – Songs Address - Youth
 1969 – Tomorrow, on April 3rd...  
 1969 – Singing Guitars  
 1970 – And People Need a Song So...  
 1970 – Magic Power  
 1971 – Shadowboxing  
 1971 – Singing by Maria Pakhomenko  
 1972 – The Last Days of Pompeii  
 1974 – Krechinsky's Wedding  
 1975 – Love Will Remain  
 1976 – Truffaldino from Bergamo  
 1978 – Leaving Go Away  
 1979 – Travel to Another City  
 1979 – Three Men in a Boat  
 1980 – Two-voice Melody  
 1981 – Three Short Stories about Love
 1981 – Two Voices
 1982 – No One Can Replace You
 1989 – Death of Tarelkin

References

External links

1933 births
Living people
Soviet composers
Soviet male composers
Soviet film score composers
Soviet male classical composers
Russian composers
Russian male composers
Musicians from Saint Petersburg
Russian male classical composers
20th-century Russian male musicians
21st-century Russian male musicians
Male musical theatre composers
Saint Petersburg Electrotechnical University alumni
Recipients of the Lenin Komsomol Prize